Sandro Ramírez Castillo (born 9 July 1995), known simply as Sandro, is a Spanish professional footballer who plays as a forward for UD Las Palmas on loan from SD Huesca. 

He began his professional career at Barcelona playing mainly in their reserves, and won seven domestic and international honours with the first team. In 2017 he signed with Everton after a successful season with Málaga, being loaned three times before his release.

Sandro was a Spanish youth international.

Club career

Barcelona

Born in Las Palmas, Canary Islands, Sandro joined FC Barcelona's youth setup in 2009, aged 14, after starting out at local UD Las Palmas. On 10 June 2013, he was promoted to the former's B team, and made his professional debut on 17 August in a 2–1 away loss against CD Mirandés in the Segunda División.

Sandro scored his first goal as a professional on 15 September 2013, netting the first of a 2–0 home win against Real Madrid Castilla. He finished the campaign with 31 appearances, netting seven times to help his team finish third.

On 18 August 2014, Sandro scored the last of a 6–0 victory over Club León for that year's Joan Gamper Trophy, after assisting fellow youth graduate Munir El Haddadi in the fifth. He was also called up to the main squad for the match against Elche CF, but remained unused in the 3–0 La Liga win on 24 August.

Sandro made his debut in the Spanish top division on 31 August 2014, coming on as a substitute for Pedro midway through the second half of the fixture at Villarreal CF and scoring the game's only goal 12 minutes later. He netted for the first time in the UEFA Champions League on 21 October, contributing to a 3–1 group stage home win against AFC Ajax with an injury-time strike. On 16 December, he scored his first goal in the Copa del Rey, in an 8–1 home rout of SD Huesca.

On 2 December 2015, in the midst of a lengthy scoring drought for both players, Sandro scored a hat-trick and assisted once whilst Munir contributed a brace in the 6–1 home defeat of CF Villanovense in the domestic cup, to send Barcelona into the round of 16. As the former appeared in just ten league games throughout the season, technical director Robert Fernández announced in May 2016 that the player would leave the club the following month, adding he was only kept in the squad due to a transfer embargo that was to end shortly after.

Málaga
On 2 July 2016, Málaga CF leaked news of the potential signing of Sandro, and their official website temporarily featured a player profile, shortly after his release from Barcelona. Five days later, they officially announced his signing on a three-year contract. He made his debut on 19 August, starting as they began the season with a 1–1 draw against CA Osasuna, and scored his first goal four weeks later to equalise in a 2–1 win over SD Eibar also at La Rosaleda.

Sandro took his season tally to 11 on 8 April 2017 after helping defeat former club Barcelona 2–0 at home, netting the first through a solo effort that started in his own half.

Everton
On 3 July 2017, Sandro signed for Everton on a four-year contract after the club triggered a £5.2 million release clause in his Málaga contract. He made his debut on 12 August, starting in a 1–0 home win against Stoke City in the Premier League. 

Sandro joined Sevilla FC on loan on 30 January 2018, for the remainder of the campaign. Seven months later, he moved to Real Sociedad also on loan.

On 2 July 2019, Sandro agreed to a one-year loan deal with Real Valladolid still in the Spanish top tier. He scored his first goal in two and a half years on 3 November, helping to a 3–0 home defeat of RCD Mallorca with a 20-meter effort in injury time.

Huesca
Sandro signed a three-year contract with Huesca on 5 October 2020, on a free transfer. On 2 August 2021, he agreed to a one-year loan deal with Getafe CF with an option to buy.

On 22 August 2022, Sandro was loaned to fellow second division side Las Palmas for one year, with a buyout clause.

International career
Sandro was a member of the Spain under-21 squad for the 2017 UEFA European Championship. He scored once for the eventual runners-up, in the 3–1 group stage win against Portugal.

Career statistics

Honours

Barcelona
La Liga: 2014–15, 2015–16
Copa del Rey: 2014–15, 2015–16
UEFA Champions League: 2014–15
UEFA Super Cup: 2015
FIFA Club World Cup: 2015

Spain U21
UEFA European Under-21 Championship runner-up: 2017

References

External links

1995 births
Living people
Spanish footballers
Footballers from Las Palmas
Association football forwards
La Liga players
Segunda División players
FC Barcelona Atlètic players
FC Barcelona players
Málaga CF players
Sevilla FC players
Real Sociedad footballers
Real Valladolid players
SD Huesca footballers
Getafe CF footballers
UD Las Palmas players
Premier League players
Everton F.C. players
UEFA Champions League winning players
Spain youth international footballers
Spain under-21 international footballers
Spanish expatriate footballers
Expatriate footballers in England
Spanish expatriate sportspeople in England